Giusfredi–Bianchi (UCI code GSB) was a professional women's cycling team, based in Italy, which is scheduled to compete in elite road bicycle racing events such as the UCI Women's Road World Cup in 2015.

Team history

2014

Riders in
On October 17, Alica Maria Arzuffi, Valentina Bastianelli, Claudia Cretti, Angela Maffeis, Rossella Ratto, Tetyana Ryabchenko, Liisi Rist, Ane Santesteban, Anna Stricker, Anna Trevisi and Daiva Tušlaitė joined the team.

Team roster

Major wins
2015
Gran Premio Mamma E Papa Guerciotti AM, Alice Maria Arzuffi
2016
Horizon Park Women Challenge, Tetyana Ryabchenko
Prologue Tour de Bretagne Feminin, Lara Vieceli
Stage 1 Giro della Toscana Int. Femminile – Memorial Michela Fanini, Anna Stricker

National champions
2015
 Estonia Time Trial, Liisi Rist
 Lithuania Road Race, Daiva Tušlaitė
 Ukraine Road Race, Tetyana Ryabchenko
2016
 Lithuania Road Race, Daiva Tušlaitė
 Romania Road Race, Ana Covrig
 Romania Time Trial, Ana Covrig
2017
 Israel Road Race, Omer Shapira

References

UCI Women's Teams
Cycling teams established in 2015
Cycling teams based in Italy